The 1985 Miami Hurricanes football team represented the University of Miami during the 1985 NCAA Division I-A football season. It was the Hurricanes' 60th season of football. The Hurricanes were led by second-year head coach Jimmy Johnson and played their home games at the Orange Bowl. They finished the season 10–2 overall. They were invited to the Sugar Bowl where they lost to Tennessee, 35-7.

Schedule

 Miami's 600th game in school history was against Colorado State.

Personnel

Roster

Recruits
Jimmy Johnson and his staff had the key recruit in the 1985 class QB Steve Walsh Jimmy also continued collecting talent from Florida, "Ten of the 19 signees are from Florida. Last year, 18 of the 25 high school players who signed letters were from Florida (11 from Dade and Broward), and 19 of 26 who signed in 1983 were from Florida (nine from Dade and Broward)."

Coaching staff

Support staff

Rankings

Game summaries

Florida

at Rice

at Boston College

at East Carolina

Cincinnati

at Oklahoma

Louisville

at Florida State

    
    
    
    
    
    
    
    
    
    

Despite being sacked seven times, Vinny Testaverde passed the Hurricanes to victory with 339 yards and four touchdowns.

at Maryland

Colorado State

Notre Dame

    
    
    
    
    
    
    
    
    
    
    

Miami scored the most points in a game since 1967. The Hurricanes scored on their first four possessions, the fifth was ended when time ran out at halftime, and then they scored the first four times they got the ball in the second half.

vs. Tennessee (Sugar Bowl)

1986 NFL Draft

References

Miami
Miami Hurricanes football seasons
Miami Hurricanes football